The 1904–05 Connecticut Aggies men's basketball team represented Connecticut Agricultural College, now the University of Connecticut, in the 1904–05 collegiate men's basketball season. The Aggies completed the season with a 3–3 overall record. The Aggies were members of the Athletic League of New England State Colleges and ended the season with a 0–1 record with a loss to Massachusetts.

Schedule 

|-
!colspan=12 style=""| Regular Season

Schedule Source:

References 

UConn Huskies men's basketball seasons
Connecticut
1904 in sports in Connecticut
1905 in sports in Connecticut